Cinder (previously known as Gordon Sharp; born 1961 in Linlithgow, West Lothian, Scotland), sometimes known as Cinder Sharp, is a Scottish singer, musician and record producer. She has led several music projects since 1976, the most significant and long-standing being Cindytalk. Cinder has gained a reputation for an unflinchingly experimental approach to music and ideas.

Biography
Cinder started a punk band called the Freeze whilst attending Linlithgow Academy in 1976.  The Freeze was active between 1976 and 1981. Cinder moved to London in 1982, changed the band's name to Cindytalk and signed to the Midnight Music label.

In 1983, Cinder sang with fellow Scots Cocteau Twins on one of their John Peel sessions and at selected live gigs, where she met 4AD executive Ivo Watts-Russell. This led to her being invited to participate as one of the featured singers with 4AD collective This Mortal Coil on its first album.

Early in her career, Cinder traveled from Scotland to London to attend a concert held by David Sylvian's band Japan, where she met John Taylor and Nick Rhodes of Duran Duran. After meeting Taylor, Cinder was repeatedly asked by him to join his Birmingham based New Romantic band. Cinder briefly stayed at Nick Rhodes' parents house in Birmingham during Duran Duran's early rehearsals, but decided on her journey back to Scotland that Duran Duran's ambitions did not sit well with her own direction.

Cindytalk released a series of group albums and singles in the 1980s and 1990s. An electronic side-project, Bambule, was started in 1994 by Cinder and Simon Carmichael.

In 2002, Cinder started to write abstract electronic music using a laptop, and since 2004 has split her time between Japan and the UK, working on various projects. This has included Cindytalk performing live (solo or group), and a number of (mostly solo) recordings. Vienna based record label Editions Mego, which is known for releasing cutting-edge electronic music, released a series of Cindytalk albums focused on Cinder's primitive noise-poetry. No longer perceived only as a singer, this repositioned Cinder and Cindytalk within the musical establishment. Of Ghosts and Buildings (2021) was released on the Japanese label Remodel, and Subterminal (2022) on the UK label False Walls, both continuing Cinder’s integration of electronics with field recordings.

References

Living people
Scottish rock singers
Scottish electronic musicians
1961 births
People educated at Linlithgow Academy
Scottish LGBT singers
Transgender singers
21st-century Scottish LGBT people